Soldadu Muhammad Razimie bin Ramlli (born 6 August 1990) is a Bruneian international footballer who plays for Singapore Premier League side DPMM FC and the Brunei national football team as a striker. Nicknamed Belanda (the Dutchman), he is a four-time Brunei Super League winner with MS ABDB and three-time domestic FA Cup medalist, twice at ABDB and once at DPMM.

Club career

Razimie is a soldier with the Royal Brunei Armed Forces who began playing with its sports council's football department in 2015, scoring 12 goals in his debut season. He won the Brunei Super League four times in a row and also the 2015 and 2016 Brunei FA Cup.

On 29 September 2017, Razimie scored a hat-trick in the 4–1 win over title contenders Kota Ranger FC, who were unbeaten before the match took place. He scored 16 goals in that season to help the Armymen win their third straight championship. Despite his mid-season transfer to DPMM, his twelve goals in the same amount of appearances in the 2018-19 season made him eligible for a fourth winner's medal when MS ABDB celebrated another league title in April 2019.

Razimie moved to Brunei's sole professional team DPMM FC in February 2019, reuniting him with his ABDB strike partner Abdul Azizi Ali Rahman. He made his debut in the home fixture against Geylang International on 9 March as a late substitute, scoring a 90th minute goal to seal a 3–0 win for his team.

On 27 June 2021, Razimie scored a hat-trick coming off the bench in a 16-1 win over BAKES FC in the 2021 Brunei Super League. A year later, Razimie managed to win his third Brunei FA Cup medal via victory over Kasuka FC in the final of the 2022 Brunei FA Cup.

International career
After another solid season in 2016, Razimie was selected for the Brunei national team in October for the 2016 AFF Suzuki Cup qualification matches and the 2016 AFC Solidarity Cup. He, along with Baharin Hamidon, was a surprise addition to the squad that usually relies heavily on Brunei DPMM FC and Tabuan Muda players. He made his debut on 21 October against Laos and scored the final goal of the game in a 4–3 defeat. He made one further appearance at the Solidarity Cup held two weeks later in Malaysia.

In April 2018, he was selected as an overage player for the Brunei under-21 team competing for the 2018 Hassanal Bolkiah Trophy held in his home country. He came on in the second half of the opening game which ended 0–1 against Timor-Leste. Later that year, he appeared for the full national team as a second-half substitute in a 1–0 win against Timor-Leste at the Hassanal Bolkiah National Stadium on 8 September.

The following year, Razimie was selected for the Wasps' two-legged 2022 World Cup qualification in June. He started in both games and scored twice in the second leg at home for a 2–1 win over Mongolia. His goals were not enough to put Brunei through as Brunei lost 2–3 on aggregate.

After the COVID-19 pandemic prevented Brunei from playing any international matches for three years, Razimie laced up for the national team in four friendlies in 2022. The first game was against Laos that finished 3–2 to the hosts in Vientiane on 27 May. Exactly two months later, he started the game against Malaysia at Bukit Jalil Stadium in a 4–0 loss. Later that September he made two further appearances for the Wasps playing at home, one from the start in a 0–3 defeat to the Maldives and one from the bench in a 1–0 win over Laos.

On 5 November the same year, Razimie came off the bench at half-time and scored two goals in a 6–2 win over Timor-Leste at the 2022 AFF Championship qualification first leg match. He earned a starting place in the second leg three days later but failed to score as Brunei lost 1–0. Brunei still went on to the group stage with a 6–3 aggregate win. At the tournament which was held the next month, Razimie played in all four of Brunei's group matches and scored a goal against the Philippines in a 5–1 loss.

International goals
Scores and results list Brunei's goal tally first.

Honours

MS ABDB
 Brunei Super League (4): 2015, 2016, 2017–18, 2018–19
 Brunei FA Cup (2): 2015, 2016
 Sumbangsih Cup (2): 2016, 2017

DPMM FC
 Singapore Premier League: 2019
 Brunei FA Cup: 2022

References

External links
 
 

1990 births
Living people
Association football forwards
Bruneian military personnel
Bruneian footballers
Brunei international footballers
MS ABDB players
DPMM FC players